There are 100 species of Bryozoa (moss animals) recorded in Ireland.

Class Gymnolaemata

Order Cheilostomata

Family Adeonidae

Reptadeonella violacea

Family Aeteidae

Aetea anguina
Aetea truncata

Family Bitectiporidae

Pentapora fascialis
Schizomavella linearis
Schizomavella sarniensis

Family Bryocryptellidae

Palmiskenea skenei
Porella compressa

Family Bugulidae

Bicellariella ciliata
Bugula angustiloba
Bugula avicularia
Bugula calathus
Bugula fulva
Bugula neritina 
Bugula plumosa
Bugula purpurotincta 
Bugula stolonifera
Bugula turbinata

Family Candidae

Caberea boryi
Caberea ellisii
Scrupocellaria reptans
Scrupocellaria scrupea 
Scrupocellaria scruposa

Family Calloporidae

Callopora lineata
Callopora rylandi
Cauloramphus spiniferum

Family Cellariidae

Cellaria fistulosa
Cellaria salicornioides
Cellaria sinuosa

Family Celleporidae

Buskea dichotoma
Buskea quincuncialis
Cellepora pumicosa
Celleporina caliciformis
Omalosecosa ramulosa
Turbicellepora avicularis

Family Cribrilinidae

Cribrilina cryptooecium

Family Cryptosulidae

Cryptosula pallasiana

Family Diastoporidae

Diplosolen obelia

Family Electridae

Electra pilosa

Family Escharellidae
various species

Family Escharinidae

Phaeostachys spinifera

Family Eucrateidae

Eucratea loricata

Family Exochellidae

Escharoides coccinea

Family Flustridae

Carbasea carbasea
Chartella papyracea
Flustra foliacea
Securiflustra securifrons

Family Haplopomidae

Haplopoma impressum

Family Hippothoidae

Celleporella hyalina

Family Membraniporidae

Conopeum reticulum
Conopeum seurati
Membranipora membranacea

Family Microporellidae

Fenestrulina malusii

Family Phidoloporidae

Reteporella beaniana
Reteporella grimaldii

Family Schizoporellidae

Schizoporella unicornis

Family Scrupariidae

Scruparia chelata

Family Smittinidae

Parasmittina trispinosa
Smittina affinis
Smittoidea reticulata

Family Umbonulidae

Oshurkovia littoralis

Order Ctenostomatida

Family Alcyonidiidae

Alcyonidioides mytili
Alcyonidium diaphanum
Alcyonidium gelatinosum
Alcyonidium hirsutum
Alcyonidium parasiticum

Family Flustrellidridae

Flustrellidra hispida

Family Vesiculariidae

Amathia lendigera
Bowerbankia imbricata 
Bowerbankia pustulosa
Vesicularia spinosa

Class Stenolaemata

Order Cyclostomatida

Family Crisiidae

Crisia aculeata
Crisia denticulata
Crisia eburnea 
Crisidia cornuta
Filicrisia geniculata

Family Lichenoporidae

Disporella hispida

Family Plagioeciidae

Plagioecia patina

Family Tubuliporidae

Tubulipora liliacea
Tubulipora plumosa

References

Prenant M. et Bobin G., 1966. Bryozoaires. 2ème partie. Chilostomes, Anasca. Faune de France n° 68  647 p.PDF (33 Mo) Identification

External links
Marine species identification portal

Ireland, bryozoa
Bryozoans
bryozoa